Micromyrtus elobata is a plant species of the family Myrtaceae endemic to Western Australia.

It blooms between January to December and produces white flowers.

It is found on plains and dunes along the south coast in the Goldfields-Esperance region of Western Australia.

References

elobata
Flora of Western Australia
Plants described in 1867
Taxa named by Ferdinand von Mueller